Robert James Sheffield (born February 2, 1966) is an American music journalist and author.

He is a long time contributing editor at Rolling Stone, writing about music, TV, and pop culture. Previously, he was a contributing editor at Blender, Spin and Details magazines.   A native of Milton, Massachusetts, Sheffield has a bachelor's degree from Yale University and master's degree (1991) from the University of Virginia.

Sheffield lives in Brooklyn, New York.

Published works
Sheffield has written several books including a memoir, Love Is a Mix Tape: Life and Loss, One Song at a Time (an excerpt of which was featured in the January 2007 issue of GQ), was released by Random House in January 2007. It was met with much acclaim and was a national bestseller.

Sheffield's fifth book, released in April 2017, is called Dreaming the Beatles: The Love Story of One Band and the Whole World.  An excerpt from Sheffield's most recent book, Dreaming the Beatles, was published online by Rolling Stone. USA Today gave Dreaming the Beatles three and one-half (out of four) stars and called it a "charming new collection of essays." Spin added that "Dreaming the Beatles is equal parts history and cultural criticism, as Sheffield draws from dozens of sources to lay down the story of how the Beatles came to be, before writing about why any of it matters." MTV opined that "Dreaming the Beatles is one of the best books about the band ever written." Sheffield won the ASCAP Foundation's Virgil Thomson Award for Outstanding Music Criticism for Dreaming the Beatles in 2017.

Bibliography 
 2007 – Love Is a Mix Tape: Life and Loss, One Song at a Time. 
 2009 – Bande Originale (French Edition). 
 2010 – Talking to Girls About Duran Duran: One Young Man's Quest for True Love and a Cooler Haircut. 
 2013 – Turn Around Bright Eyes: The Rituals of Love and Karaoke. 
 2016 – On Bowie. 
 2017 – Dreaming the Beatles: The Love Story of One Band and the Whole World. 
 2019 – The Wild Heart of Stevie Nicks (Audible book).

References

External links

Living people
American music critics
American music journalists
Rolling Stone people
Writers from Boston
1966 births
American memoirists
People from Milton, Massachusetts
Yale University alumni
University of Virginia alumni